Alamgir Kabir may refer to:
 Alamgir Kabir (film maker) (1938–1989), Bangladeshi film director
 Alamgir Kabir (cricketer) (born 1981), Bangladeshi test cricketer
 Alamgir M. A. Kabir (1911–1996), Bangladeshi police officer and recipient of the Independence Award
 Alamgir Kabir (politician) (born 1948), Bangladesh Nationalist Party politician